Events in the year 2019 in Guyana.

Incumbents
President: David Granger
Prime Minister: Moses Nagamootoo

Events 
December 20 – Production of crude oil starts from the Liza oil field in the Stabroek Block offshore Guyana.

Scheduled – The 2019 Guyanese general election was postponed and held on 2 March 2020.

Deaths
5 January – Odeen Ishmael, diplomat (b. 1948).

31 May – Andaiye, political activist (b. 1942).

References

 
2010s in Guyana
Years of the 21st century in Guyana
Guyana
Guyana